Stratford Hall is a historic house museum near Lerty in Westmoreland County, Virginia. It was the plantation house of four generations of the Lee family of Virginia (with descendants later to expand to Maryland and other states). Stratford Hall is the boyhood home of two Founding Fathers of the United States and signers of the Declaration of Independence, Richard Henry Lee (1732–1794), and Francis Lightfoot Lee (1734–1797). Stratford Hall is also the birthplace of Robert E. Lee (1807–1870), who served as General-in-Chief of the Confederate States Army during the American Civil War (1861–1865). The Stratford Hall estate was designated a National Historic Landmark  in 1960, under the care of the National Park Service in the U.S. Department of the Interior.

History

Colonel Thomas Lee (1690–1750) was a Virginian who served as acting Governor of the colony and was a strong advocate for westward expansion.  Lee purchased the land for Stratford Hall in 1717, aware of its agricultural and commercial potential as a waterfront site. Construction of the Georgian Great House did not begin until the late 1730s. Designed by an unknown architect, the brick Great House is a two-story H-shaped structure, surrounded on four corners by attending outbuildings, all of which still stand today. Following construction of the Great House, Thomas Lee expanded the site into a bustling hive of activity, and soon the working plantation became "a towne in itself" as one visitor to Stratford marveled. A wharf on the Potomac River was the destination for a large number of merchant ships, a grist mill ground wheat and corn there, and enslaved and indentured servants farmed tobacco and other crops on the thousands of acres of farmland. Blacksmiths, coopers, carpenters, tailors, gardeners, and weavers plied their trades at Thomas Lee's Stratford. Stratford Hall is set in the Historic Northern Neck of Virginia, a rural peninsula where historic Christ Church is located 50 miles southeast.

In the midst of this busy world, Thomas Lee and his wife Hannah Harrison Ludwell (1701–1749) raised eight children, six sons and two daughters. They played important roles in shaping the early history of the nation. His eldest son, Philip Ludwell Lee Sr., Esquire (1727–1775) inherited Stratford Hall. Richard Henry Lee (1732–1794) and Francis Lightfoot Lee (1734–1797) were delegates from Virginia to the Second Continental Congress, and signers of the Declaration of Independence. Richard Henry was later instrumental in guiding the fledgling nation, serving as President of Congress in 1784–85. Thomas Ludwell Lee, active in local politics, served as a Virginian legislator and helped compose the Virginia Declaration of Rights. William Lee (1739–1795) and Dr. Arthur Lee (1740–1792) were diplomats to England during the turbulent struggle for American independence. Hannah Lee was an early proponent of women's rights, and Alice Lee married the prominent physician William Shippen Jr. (1736–1808) of Philadelphia.

Philip Ludwell Lee Sr. (1727–1775), a member of the House of Burgesses and the King's Council, continued to expand the plantation after he inherited Stratford until it eventually encompassed almost . A lover of horses and music, Philip and his wife Elizabeth Steptoe (1743–1789) had two daughters, the oldest of them known as the "divine Matilda".  Philip died in 1775, and Elizabeth remarried in 1780 to Philip Richard Fendall I (1734–1805). The new couple continued to reside at Stratford Hall with her two daughters and her son-in-law (and later a hero of the Revolutionary War, Henry "Light Horse Harry" Lee (1756–1818), who had married her daughter Matilda. An arrangement was reached in 1784-1785 that the Fendalls would turn over their rights to Stratford Hall, and Henry would sell a one-half acre lot situated on Oronoco Street in Alexandria, Virginia for 300 pounds. It was there that Philip R. Fendall built the Lee-Fendall House.  Matilda inherited Stratford Hall in this agreement and lived there with her husband Harry and her second cousin, but the couple's time together was cut short when Matilda died after eight years of marriage.

During this period, Caesar, an enslaved man, served as chef. He was noted for preparing hot chocolate for guests, as the hall had one of the first three chocolate grinding stones in Virginia. His son Caesar Jr. was the plantation's postillion.

Several years passed before "Light Horse Harry" remarried to Ann Hill Carter (1773–1827) of Shirley Plantation. Their fourth child, Robert Edward Lee (1807–1870), was born at Stratford Hall in 1807. Robert E. Lee spent only his first four years at Stratford Hall, yet remembered it fondly for the remainder of his life. In the middle of the Civil War, Lee wrote his wife that "In the absence of a home I wish I could purchase Stratford. That is the only place I could go to, now accessible to us, that would inspire me with feelings of pleasure and local love. You and the girls could remain there in quiet. It is a poor place, but we could make enough cornbread and bacon for our support and the girls could weave us clothes. I wonder if it is for sale and at how much."

Light Horse Harry fell heavily into debt and eventually served a two-year term in debtors' prison.  Anne Carter Lee and the children departed from Stratford Hall during the winter of 1810–11, and moved to Alexandria. Stratford Hall passed into the hands of Harry and Matilda's surviving son Major Henry Lee IV "Black Horse" (1787–1837), but financial troubles and personal scandal forced him to sell the plantation several years later.

After the Lees

Stratford Hall remained in private hands for more than a century. William C. Somerville of Maryland purchased the property from Henry Lee IV in 1822.  After his death his heirs discovered that obligations incurred by Henry Lee IV continued to encumber the property. The plantation was foreclosed in 1828 and purchased by Henry D. Storke of Westmoreland County, who was married to Elizabeth "Besty" McCarty, sister of Henry Lee IV's wife, Anne Robinson McCarty.  Besty Storke lived on the property until her death in 1879 and was buried there.

In 1929, a group of women dedicated to preserving the memory of Robert E. Lee and the Lee family joined to form the Robert E. Lee Memorial Association and purchased Stratford Hall from the Storkes' heirs. The site is maintained by the Association and is open to the public.

Stratford Hall was depicted on a 4¢ United States postage stamp of the 1936–1937 Army-Navy issue. The stamp shows General Robert E. Lee and "Stonewall" Jackson, with Stratford Hall in the center.

Burials at Stratford Hall
Thomas Lee
Hannah Harrison Ludwell Lee

See also
List of National Historic Landmarks in Virginia
National Register of Historic Places listings in Westmoreland County, Virginia

References

Further reading

External links 

Official website of Stratford Hall

National Historic Landmark: Stratford Hall
The Inn at Stratford Hall
"Stratford Hall" in the Encyclopedia of Virginia

Historic American Buildings Survey in Virginia
Archaeological sites in Virginia
Georgian architecture in Virginia
Historic house museums in Virginia
Lee family residences
National Historic Landmarks in Virginia
Museums in Westmoreland County, Virginia
Plantation houses in Virginia
Biographical museums in Virginia
Houses in Westmoreland County, Virginia
National Register of Historic Places in Westmoreland County, Virginia
Houses on the National Register of Historic Places in Virginia
Lee, Robert E
Homes of United States Founding Fathers